The Nashville Kangaroos is a United States Australian Football League, USAFL, team, based in Nashville, United States. It was founded in 1997 and is a Founding Club of the USAFL. The club's mascot is a red kangaroo, a happy coincidence as the Nashville Zoo features red kangaroos in Kangaroo Kickabout, an interactive exhibit with 4,500 square feet of naturalistic Australian landscape.

In 2021, the Men's team won their first National Championship in Division IV going 4-0 for the clean sweep as National Champions.

References

External links
 

Australian rules football clubs in the United States
Sports in Nashville, Tennessee
Australian rules football clubs established in 1997
1997 establishments in Tennessee